Nyctacovirus is a subgenus of viruses in the genus Alphacoronavirus.

Species
The genus consists of the following two species:

 Nyctalus velutinus alphacoronavirus SC-2013
 Pipistrellus kuhlii coronavirus 3398

References

Virus subgenera
Alphacoronaviruses